Seriola dorsalis, the California yellowtail is a species of ray-finned fish of the family Carangidae. This species is also known by several alternate names, such as amberjack, forktail, mossback, white salmon and yellowtail tunis or tuna  or by its Spanish name jurel. Although previously thought to belong to S. lalandi, recent genetic analysis distinguished California yellowtail (S. dorsalis) as a distinct species from the yellowtail amberjack (S. lalandi).

Diet
The California yellowtail is carnivorous and feeds on a variety of fish. Mackerel, sardines, anchovies, squid, crab, and smelts are common in the yellowtail's diet. Often, California yellowtail are found in schools feeding at the surface of the water, as well as deeper. Temperatures cooler than 18 °C would make the yellowtail sink into deeper waters to conserve energy.

Range and habitat
The California yellowtail's range is circumglobal, in subtropical waters. It can be found near Catalina Island, San Clemente Island, and Santa Monica Bay, as well as in Mexican waters such as the Baja California Peninsula and the Gulf of California, congregating at certain areas in mass numbers like Cedros Island and Benitos Island. During the summer they can also be found in association with floating kelp paddies off the coast of southern California and Baja California.  Yellowtail populations have also been found in waters off South Africa, the Walter Shoals, Amsterdam Island, Japan, Australia, New Zealand, New Caledonia, Hawaii, Rapa, Pitcairn Island, Jeju Island, and Easter Island. In the Eastern Pacific, they can be found in waters off British Columbia, south to Chile. They are usually found around offshore islands, rocky reefs, and kelp beds. They are also found in increasing numbers off the Islands of the Tristan da Cunha archipelago in the South Atlantic. They are frequently caught on the three northern Islands of Tristan da Cunha, Nightingale and Inaccessible and were recently reported by Factory Manager Erik Mac Kenzie at Gough Island at 40 degrees South, which is 200 miles south of the other islands. Fish in the size range 25 to 40 kg are not uncommon and are caught both from boats and the shore.

Conservation status
This fish is listed as "least concern" by the IUCN, on the basis that "significant global population declines have not been reported and are not suspected. Its range coincides with numerous marine protected areas."

References

Further reading
 

dorsalis
Fish described in 1863